Kupri is a village and gram panchayat in Jagat block, Budaun district, Uttar Pradesh, India. Its village code is 128441. The village is located 16 KM East from Budaun railway station. According to 2011 Census of India, the total population of the village is 1210, out of 675 are males and 535 are females.

References 

Villages in Budaun district